Zakhmona is a 2017 Pashto action thriller film made by Shahid Usman. It was released on 26 June 2017.

References

External links

 Zakhmona on UrduPoint
 Zakhmona on Pakfilms.net

Pashto-language films
2017 action thriller films
2017 films
Pakistani action thriller films